Rhoscopus or Rhoskopous, or Rhuscopus or Rhouskopous (Ῥουσκόπους), also known as Rhixoupous, was a coastal town of ancient Pamphylia near the mouth of the Cestrus River, inhabited during Roman times.

Its site is located east of Magydus, in Asiatic Turkey.

References

Populated places in ancient Pamphylia
Former populated places in Turkey
Roman towns and cities in Turkey
History of Antalya Province